Thérès Manser (born 13 June 1956) is a Swiss sports shooter. She competed in the women's 25 metre pistol event at the 1984 Summer Olympics.

References

1956 births
Living people
Swiss female sport shooters
Olympic shooters of Switzerland
Shooters at the 1984 Summer Olympics
Place of birth missing (living people)